Colonel David Lyulph Gore Wolseley Ogilvy, 12th and 7th Earl of Airlie  (18 July 189328 December 1968) was a Scottish peer, soldier, and courtier.

He was the eldest son of David Ogilvy, 11th Earl of Airlie, and his wife, the former Lady Mabell Gore. He inherited his father's titles in 1900 at the age of six, and was one of the trainbearers to Mary of Teck at her coronation in 1911. He became a Representative Peer for Scotland in 1922, was appointed a lord-in-waiting in Stanley Baldwin's government in April 1926, and was made a Knight Commander of the Royal Victorian Order on 10 May 1929.

In June 1936, he became Lord Lieutenant of Angus and was appointed Lord Chamberlain to Queen Elizabeth in March 1937. As a senior member of the royal household, he was a guest at the 1947 wedding of Princess Elizabeth and Philip Mountbatten, Duke of Edinburgh. He was elevated to Knight Grand Cross of the Royal Victorian Order in 1938, made a Knight of the Order of the Thistle in 1942 and was appointed Chancellor of the Order of the Thistle in 1956.

He was the father in-law of Princess Alexandra of Kent, Lady Ogilvy.

Marriage
On 17 July 1917, Lord Airlie married Lady Alexandra Coke (d. 1984), second daughter of Thomas Coke, 3rd Earl of Leicester, and they had six children, twenty-one grandchildren, and twenty-nine great-grandchildren:

 Lady Victoria Jean Marjorie Mabell Ogilvy (21 September 1918 – 23 September 2004); married Alexander Lloyd, 2nd Baron Lloyd, on 24 January 1942. They had three children:
 The Hon. Davinia Margaret Lloyd (b. 13 March 1943)
 The Hon. Charles George David Lloyd (4 April 1949 – 1974)
 The Hon. Laura Blanche Bridget Lloyd (b. 7 March 1960)
 Lady Margaret Helen Isla Marion Ogilvy (23 July 1920 – 22 January 2014); married Iain Tennant on 11 July 1946. They had three children and six grandchildren.
 Lady Griselda Davinia Roberta Ogilvy (12 June 1924 – 8 June 1977); married Major Peter Balfour on 6 November 1948 and they were divorced in 1968. They had three children.
 David George Coke Patrick Ogilvy, 13th Earl of Airlie (b. 17 May 1926); married Virginia Fortune Ryan on 23 October 1952. They have six children and eleven grandchildren. 
 The Hon. Sir Angus James Bruce Ogilvy (14 September 1928 – 26 December 2004); married Princess Alexandra of Kent on 24 April 1963. They had two children and four grandchildren.
 The Hon. James Donald Diarmid Ogilvy (b. 1934); married Magdalen Jane Ruth Ducas on 2 July 1959 and they were divorced in 1980. They have four children and eight grandchildren. He remarried Lady Caroline Child-Villiers (daughter of the 9th Earl of Jersey) in 1980.

Military career
Lord Airlie was commissioned into the 10th Hussars from the Royal Military College, Sandhurst, in 1912. He reached the rank of captain in the First World War, in which he won the Military Cross.

He retired from the Regular Army in 1921, but joined the 5th Battalion (4th/5th Battalion from 1922), Black Watch (Territorial Army) as a major. He was lieutenant-colonel commanding from 1924–29, being promoted colonel in 1928. In 1940 he was commissioned lieutenant-colonel in the Scots Guards, reverting at his own request to the rank of major until 1942. He resigned his commission in 1948. He was commandant of the Army Cadet Forces, Scotland in 1943. He was awarded the honorary degree of Doctor of Laws (LL.D) by the University of St Andrews in 1958.

Sporting pursuits
Lord Airlie owned many racehorses, most notably the steeplechaser, Master Robert, which won the 1924 Grand National in the Earl's colours.

Lord Airlie, died 28 Dec 1968, aged 75yrs at his home, Airlie Castle, Angus, Scotland.

References

External links

Earls of Airlie
Knights of the Thistle
Knights Grand Cross of the Royal Victorian Order
Conservative Party (UK) Baronesses- and Lords-in-Waiting
10th Royal Hussars officers
Black Watch officers
Scots Guards officers
Graduates of the Royal Military College, Sandhurst
British Army personnel of World War I
British Army personnel of World War II
Recipients of the Military Cross
Scottish representative peers
Lord-Lieutenants of Angus
1893 births
1968 deaths